Uchangidurga  is a village in the southern state of Karnataka, India. It is located in the Harapanahalli taluk of Vijayanagara district in Karnataka.

Demographics
 India census, Uchangidurga Village has a population of 9781, of which 4926 are males and 4855 are females.

Uchangidurga was ruled under Nayakas (Madakari Nayakas of Chitradurga) and is the site of Uchangemma Temple, where on every month's full moon day, people gather to worship Uchangemma.

Festivals of Dasara/ Navaratri, and Ugadi are celebrated every year and devotees from all corners of Karnataka gather in thousands to witness the celebrations.

Location
Uchangidurga is located 30 km from Davangere on the Anaji route. After taking a left turn, the fort is visible from the junction.

History
Uchangidurga during the Kadamba time was known as "Uchchasringi." A great battle between the Pallava king Nanakkdas and the Kadamba king Krishnavarma was fought in this very place according to the 4th-century inscription found at Anaji. The latter suffered a huge defeat at the hands of the Pallavas and Krishnavarma was forced to retreat to Banavasi. Later, Chalukyas reigned supreme and brought this area under their control. They defeated Pallavas, who had occupied the territory and chased them further south. In the middle of the 12th century when Chlaukyas became weak and fading, Pandyas took charge of this region. Tribhuvan Malla Pandya, Vijay Pandya Deva, and Vira Pandya Deva ruled over the region. Uchangidurga was the capital of the Pandyas, who claimed to be from the Yadav race and that their capital was Kanchipuram.

Hoysalas took charge of this territory by defeating the Pandyas in the 12th century. King Vishnuvardhana routed them in the battle and he took charge of the strategic Uchangidurga fort. After the fall of Hoysalas the Vijaynagar rulers took over and dominated the region and it was given to Nayakas to govern. Hanumappa Nayaka was the first to govern, later followed by Timmanna Nayaka. Timmanna Nayaka was considered to be a courageous and daring soldier. It is said he once snuck into the enemy camp and rode off with the general's horse, earning him instant recognition from the Vijaynagar emperor. He was asked to lead the army against Gulbarga sultanate. He was successful in defeating the Bahmani Sultans. In recognition of his feat, he was given charge of Uchangidurga. However, he abducted a courtesan from the Vijaynagar empire and provoked the wrath of the emperor. He escaped to Miyakonda and then to the jungles of Guntur. He was ultimately forced to surrender at Rangapatna to the emperor's forces and was imprisoned at Chitradurga Fort for his treason.

His son Obana Nayaka was installed to the throne at Chitradurga. After the fall of the Vijaynagar Empire in 1565, he assumed the title of the Madakeri Nayaka.

He declared his independence and then constructed the fort at Chitradurga, Kallina Kote. This territory was sandwiched between the Marathas and Hyder Ali. By doing this, Uchangidurga formed a pivot during the reign of the Nayakas through constant battle. Some of the Nayakas took protection under Marathas and soon this region was captured by Hyder Ali. Thereafter, Tipu Sultan took over the territory till 1799 AD when he was defeated by the British in the Anglo-Mysore Wars.

Uchangidurga Fortress 
Heavy rainfall and human encroachment have taken their toll on the fort. Recently the fortress area was taken over by the Department of Archaeological Survey of India.

See also
Bellary
 Districts of Karnataka

References

External links
www.bellary.nic.in//
 Pictures of Uchangidurga - http://karnatakatravel.blogspot.in/2013/08/fort-uchangidurga.html

Forts in Karnataka